Laura Mylotte, (born on 5 August 1975 in Birmingham) is a professional squash player who represented Ireland. She reached a career-high world ranking of World No. 43 in November 2007.

References

External links 

Irish female squash players
Living people
1975 births
Sportspeople from Birmingham, West Midlands